Assimil (often stylised as ASSiMiL) is a French company, founded by Alphonse Chérel in 1929. It creates and publishes foreign language courses, which began with their first book Anglais Sans Peine ("English Without Toil"). Since then, the company has expanded into numerous other languages and continues to publish today.

Their method for teaching foreign languages is through listening to recordings, and the reading of a book with the text that you are listening to: one side native language, one side foreign language.  This method is focused on learning whole sentences, for an organic learning of the grammar.  It begins with a long passive phase of only reading and listening, and eventually adds active exercises.  Most books contain around 100 lessons, with the active phase starting on Lesson 50. The word "Assimil" comes from assimilate "incorporate or absorb knowledge into the mind".

The company publishes several different series:
"Learn" series, which teach to an A2 level;
"With Ease" series, which teach basic rules of grammar and a vocabulary of 2000–3000 words;
"Perfectionnement" ("Using") series, which teaches more advanced idiosyncrasies and idioms of the target language;
Business series, which focuses on vocabulary related to international business;
Idioms series, which teaches common idioms;
Phrasebooks, which serve as a travel companion;
Slang series, for contemporary slang usage;
"Assimemor" ("My First Words") series, which is meant to introduce a language to young children

Languages

English base
For the English reader, the following languages are available:

See also
Language education
List of Language Self-Study Programs

External links

A Gift in Any Language

Language education publishing companies
Publishing companies of France
Publishing companies established in 1929
1929 establishments in France
Second-language acquisition
Language-teaching methodology